Francesco Vairano (born 11 January 1944) is an Italian actor and voice actor.

Biography
Born in Naples, Vairano began his career in the late 1960s working as a theatre actor. He also made appearances on television. He is generally well known to the Italian public as a voice dubber. He is best known for providing the Italian voices of Severus Snape (Alan Rickman) from the Harry Potter film franchise and Gollum (Andy Serkis) from both The Lord of the Rings and The Hobbit.

Vairano is also known for dubbing Dr. Bunsen Honeydew and various characters in The Muppets. He occasionally dubbed actors such as Robert Downey Jr., William Hurt, and Ian McDiarmid. In December 2016, he announced that he would be temporarily retiring from voice dubbing and would only make rare comebacks.

Filmography

Television
 Sherlock Holmes - TV Miniseries (1968)
 Rebecca - TV film (1969)
 Special-Sto - TV miniseries (1970)
 Le terre del sacramento -  TV miniseries (1970)
 L'età di Cosimo de' Medici - TV miniseries (1972–73)
 All'ultimo minuto - TV series (1973)
 Processo per magia - TV film
 La scuola della maldicenza - TV film (1975)
Non stop - TV show (1977)
 Ma che cos'è questo amore - TV miniseries (1979) 
 L'eredità della priora - TV miniseries (1980)
 La bisbetica domata, regia di Marco Parodi - TV series
 Don Chisciotte -  TV film (1983)
La TV delle ragazze - variety show (1988)

Dubbing roles

Animation
Dr. Bunsen Honeydew in The Muppet Movie, The Great Muppet Caper, The Muppet Christmas Carol, Muppet Treasure Island, Muppets From Space,  It's a Very Merry Muppet Christmas Movie, The Muppets' Wizard of Oz, The Muppets, Muppets Most Wanted (Italian version)
 Animal, Beaker, Betina Cratchit, Peter Cratchit and Bean Bunny in The Muppet Christmas Carol (Italian version)
 Beaker, Lew Zealand and Neville in The Great Muppet Caper (Italian version)
 Camilla the Chicken, Janice and Lew Zealand in The Muppet Movie (Italian 1994 version)
Tom and Droopy in Tom and Jerry: The Movie (Italian version)
Dr. Finkelstein in The Nightmare Before Christmas (Italian version)
Huy in The Prince of Egypt (Italian version)
Mr. Ping in Kung Fu Panda, Kung Fu Panda 2, Kung Fu Panda 3 (Italian version)
Merlin in Shrek the Third (Italian version)
Rumpelstiltskin in Shrek Forever After, Donkey's Christmas Shrektacular, Shrek's Yule Log (Italian version)
Oscar the Grouch in The Adventures of Elmo in Grouchland (Italian version)
Berkeley Beetle in Thumbelina (Italian version)
George Merry in The Pagemaster (Italian version)
Second Ancestor in Mulan, Mulan II (Italian version)
Madame Gasket in Robots (Italian version)
Boingo in Hoodwinked! (Italian version)
Rat in Sinbad: Legend of the Seven Seas (Italian version)
Tiger in Over the Hedge (Italian version)
Morty in ChalkZone (Italian version)
The Priest in Hellsing (Italian version)

Live action
Severus Snape in Harry Potter and the Philosopher's Stone, Harry Potter and the Chamber of Secrets, Harry Potter and the Prisoner of Azkaban, Harry Potter and the Goblet of Fire, Harry Potter and the Order of the Phoenix, Harry Potter and the Half-Blood Prince, Harry Potter and the Deathly Hallows – Part 1, Harry Potter and the Deathly Hallows – Part 2
Gollum in The Lord of the Rings: The Fellowship of the Ring, The Lord of the Rings: The Two Towers, The Lord of the Rings: The Return of the King, The Hobbit: An Unexpected Journey,  The Hobbit: The Desolation of Smaug (Italian version)
Charlie Chaplin in Chaplin (Italian version)
Luis Molina in Kiss of the Spider Woman (Italian version)
Palpatine / Darth Sidious in Star Wars: Episode III – Revenge of the Sith, Star Wars: Episode IX – The Rise of Skywalker (Italian version)
Hans in My Own Private Idaho (Italian version)
Moreno the innkeeper in  Pinocchio

References

External links

 
 

1944 births
Living people
Male actors from Naples
Italian male stage actors
Italian male voice actors
Italian male television actors
Italian voice directors
20th-century Italian male actors
21st-century Italian male actors